Arachnitis uniflora, the sole species in the genus Arachnitis, is a non-photosynthetic species of plant.  It is a myco-heterotroph which gets many of its nutrients from fungi of the genus Glomus which live in its roots.

It is native to southern South America (Bolivia, Chile, Argentina) and the Falkland Islands.

Description
Although the fungi in question are in some ways the same kind of arbuscular mycorrhizae which are found in the roots of many plants, the details of their association with the plant roots differ in key ways (such as the absence of arbuscules).

References

Bibliography 
* 

Corsiaceae
Monotypic Liliales genera
Parasitic plants
Flora of South America
Flora of the Falkland Islands